St. Thomas' College, Matale (Sinhala: මාතලේ ශාන්ත තෝමස් විද්‍යාලය), or (STC), is a secondary school for only boys; located in Matale, Sri Lanka,

History 
The school was established in 1873 under the verandah of a small mud-and-wattle church. The first class of students included 75 boys and 12 girls. In 1876, the school was split into separate boys and girls schools by Rev. Fr. Aloysius J. M. Marrer. The headmaster of the boys' school was Leo de Silva, and the leader of the girls' school was Rosa Perera. The girls' school was named St. Agnes Convent School, which is now known as St. Thomas Girls' School.

In January 1880, a secular priest (also known as a diocesan priest), Rev. Fr. Pius Fernando, from Negombo, arrived at the school. Fernando spent half a century of his priestly life in Matale and died in 1930.

In 1901, the Robinson Memorial Hall was built on land donated by John Croos of Negombo. In 1904, Joseph Gregory Perera, a former student of the school, joined as a pupil-teacher and retired in 1946. He was popularly known as “Joseph Master”. During that time the headmasters were J. M. Direckse, A. S. Scharnignivel, L. D’w. Jayasighe, C. J. Rodrigo and Charles Robinson. Robinson was appointed as headmaster on 1 September 1923, retiring in 1958.

Cadet Platoon (Junior) was inaugurated on 10 December 1938 under the charge of J. B. Madasekara. E. A. Perusinghe, who was a Lieutenant, took over cadeting. The Scout Troop 3rd Matale was inaugurated in 1935 with F. de S. Gunawardena as Scout Master and S. B. Pamunuwa as his assistant.

When Robinson retired, he was succeeded by George Denlow, who left the school after a short stint and was replaced by B. J. Perera.

Education
There are more than 2,000 students studying in the college (July 2014). They have many facilities of studying leading to qualifications such as grade 5 scholarship exams, O/L and A/L.

Past principals

Houses
Austin  - 
Bede    - 
Clement - 
Pius    -

Competition
The school's main rival is the Science College, Matale. Matches between the two are often called the "Battle of the Golds".

Notable alumni
The school has produced many notable persons who are well known throughout the country.

See also
 List of schools in Sri Lanka

References

External links
 
 MOTA Colombo Official website
 Dharmaraja gets new principal
 U-15 Cricket Tourney Easy win for St. Thomas’ Matale
 St. Thomas’ College, Matale win u.17 cricket final by 7 runs

Boys' schools in Sri Lanka
National schools in Sri Lanka
Schools in Matale
1873 establishments in Ceylon
Educational institutions established in 1873